Samuel James is an American scientist, a researcher specializing in evolutionary biology, focusing on earthworm taxonomy. James, with fellow researchers, has discovered numerous species of annelids, including Diplocardia californiana, Diplocardia woodi, Diplocardia montana, and a new species related to the Giant Palouse earthworm.

Since January 2011, James has been working on phylogenomic investigation of the evolutionary history of Annelida, as part of the WormNet II: Assembling the Tree of Life for Annelida project, along with researchers Christer Erseus and Bronwyn W. Williams. He is currently part of the University of Iowa's Department of Biology, where he is an Associate Adjunct Professor. Prior to the University of Iowa, James was a research associate at the University of Kansas, Biodiversity Institute, from 2003 until 2009.

List of new species observed

List of publications

1980-1984 
James, S.W. 1982. Effects of fire and soil type on earthworm populations in a tallgrass prairie. Pedobiologia 24:37-40.
Boucher, D., S.W. James and K.E. Keeler. 1982. The ecology of mutualism. Annual Review of Ecology and Systematics 13:315-347.

1985-1989 

Seastedt, T.R., S.W. James and T.C. Todd. 1989 Interactions among soil invertebrates, microbes and plant growth in the tallgrass prairie. Agriculture, Ecosystems and Environment 24:219-228.

1990-1994 

James, S.W. 1990. Oligochaeta: Megascolecidae and other earthworms from southern and midwestern North America. In D. Dindal (ed.) Soil Biology Guide. pp. 379–386. John Wiley and Sons, New York.

Wood, H.B. and S.W. James. 1993. Native and introduced earthworms from selected chaparral, woodland, and riparian zones in southern California. Gen.Tech. Rep. PSW-GTR-142. Albany, CA: Pacific Southwest Research Station, Forest Service, USDA; 20 p.

1995-1999 
Fragoso, C., S.W. James and S. Borges. 1995. Native earthworms of the north Neotropical region: current status and controversies. in P. Hendrix (ed.). Earthworm Ecology and Biogeography in North America, pp. 67–115. CRC Press, Inc, Boca Raton, Florida.
James, S.W. 1995. Systematics, biogeography and ecology of earthworms from eastern, central, southern and southwestern USA. in P. Hendrix (ed.) Earthworm Ecology and Biogeography in North America, pp. 29–51. CRC Press, Inc, Boca Raton, Florida.
James, S.W. 1996. Nine new species of Dichogaster from Guadeloupe, French West Indies (Oligochaeta, Megascolecidae) Zoologica Scripta 25:21-24.
James, S.W. 1996. Earthworms. In G. Hall (ed.) Methods for the examination of organismal diversity in soils and sediments. IUBS Methodology Series. CAB International, Wallingford, Oxon, UK.
Goodman, S.M., P. Parillo, S.W. James and P. Sierwald. 1996. Elevational variation in soil macroinvertebrates on the eastern slopes of the Reserve Naturelle Integrale d'Andingitra, Madagascar. Fieldiana (Zoology) NS. 85:144-151

James, S.W. 1998. Earthworms and earth history. pp. 3–14 in: C.A. Edwards, ed. Earthworm Ecology. Proc 5th International Symposium on Earthworm Ecology. St. Lucie Press, Boca Raton.

2000-2004 
James, S.W. 2000. Earthworms of the eastern Columbia River Basin. USDA- Forest Service General Technical Report, Pacific NW Region.

James, S.W. 2004. Earthworms from the eastern mountains of Jamaica: fourteen new species of Dichogaster (Oligochaeta: Megascolecidae). (in press, Organisms, Diversity and Evolution)
James, S.W. 2004. New species of Amynthas, Pheretima, and Pleionogaster (Clitellata: Megascolecidae) of the Mt. Kitanglad Range, Mindanao Island, Philippines. (in press, Raffles Bulletin of Zoology).
James S.W. 2004. The earthworm genus Pleionogaster in southern Luzon, Philippines. (in prep).
James, S.W., Y. Hong and T.H. Kim. 2004. New species of Pheretima and Pithemera (Oligochaeta: Megascolecidae) from Mt. Arayat, Luzon Island, Philippines. (in press, Revue Suisse de Zoologie)
Hong, Y. and S.W. James 2004. New species of Amynthas Kinberg, 1867 from the Philippines (Oligochaeta: Megascolecidae). (in press, Revue Suisse de Zoologie)
James, S.W. 2004. New genera and new species of earthworms (Clitellata: Megascolecidae) from southern Luzon, Philippines. (in press, Systematics and Biodiversity)
James, S.W. 2004. New species of Archipheretima (Clitellata: Megascolecidae) from Luzon, Philippines, with a revision of the genus. (in prep.)
James, S.W., H.-T. Shih and H.-W. Chang. 2004. Seven new species of Amynthas (Clitellata: Megascolecidae) and new earthworm records from Taiwan. Journal of Natural History. (in press).
James, S.W. 2004. Planetary processes and their interactions with earthworm and distributions and ecology. in: C.A. Edwards, ed. Earthworm Ecology. 2nd edition. St. Lucie Press, Boca Raton. (in press)
James, S.W. and P.W. Hendrix. 2004. Invasion of Exotic Earthworms into North America. in: C.A. Edwards, ed. Earthworm Ecology. 2nd edition. St. Lucie Press, Boca Raton. (in press)

2005-2009 

 Samuel James, Hsi-Te Shih, Hsueh-Wen Chang. 2005. Seven new species of Amynthas Clitellata: Megascolecidae and new earthworm records from Taiwan Journal of Natural History, Vol. 39, No. 14., 1007, doi:10.1080/00222930400001434
James, S. W. and G. G. Brown. 2006. Earthworm ecology and diversity in Brazil. p. 56–116. In: Moreira, F. M. S., J. O. Siqueira, and L. Brussaard. (eds.). Soil biodiversity in Amazonian and other Brazilian ecosystems. CAB International, Wallingford.

2010-2014 
Lang, S. A., Garcia, M. V., James, S. W., Sayers, C. W., & Shain, D. H. (2012). Phylogeny and clitellar morphology of the giant Amazonian Earthworm, Rhinodrilus priollii (Oligochaeta: Glossoscolecidae). The American Midland Naturalist, 167(2), 384–395.

Notes

References
 
 
 

American taxonomists
Living people
Place of birth missing (living people)
University of Iowa faculty
University of Kansas faculty
Year of birth missing (living people)